The International Mammalian Genome Society (IMGS) is a professional scientific organization that promotes and coordinates the genetic and genomic study of mammals. It has a scientific journal, Mammalian Genome, and organizes an annual international meeting, the International Mammalian Genome Conference (IMGC).

History and governance 
The society was formed in 1991 from informal discussions within the mouse genetics scientific community. It had 48 founding members, including Gail R. Martin, Eric Lander, Tsui Lap-chee and Shirley M. Tilghman. It has three stated goals: 
 To facilitate the creation of databases of genetic information,
 Organize meetings for mammalian geneticists to share expertise and supervise the organization of genetic data (for example, into genetic maps and reference genomes), and
 To coordinate the mapping and sequencing of model organisms with similar efforts focusing on the human genome.

The society has served as an organizing body for a number of initiatives in mouse genetics. It coordinated the formation of the International Mouse Mutagenesis Consortium, an effort to assign a function to every gene in the mammalian genome, oversaw activities of chromosome committees and advised on biological database developments. Membership of the International Mammalian Genome Society is open to all people interested in mammalian genetics. Members pay yearly dues, for which they receive voting rights and access to Mammalian Genome. The society is governed by a secretariat of three presidents (vice, current and past-president) and elected officers. Each officer is elected by a ballot of members for a period of two years; the presidents serve for a consecutive six-year period, two in each position. From 2009 the graduate student or post-doctoral fellow who wins the Verne Chapman Young Scientist Award at the annual meeting also joins the secretariat for the following two years. Secretariat elections are organized by a Nomination and Election Committee consisting of six active society members. The society also maintains an administrative office at the University of North Carolina at Chapel Hill.

Publications 

The IMGS has an official peer reviewed journal, Mammalian Genome, which was launched with the society in 1991 but published and managed by Springer. Three of the founding members of the society, Lee M. Silver, Jan Klein and Joseph H. Nadeau, served as the journal's first editors.  Mammalian Genome currently accepts both original and review articles on "experimental, theoretical, and technical aspects of genomics and genetics in mouse, human, and other species." Any changes in editors and editorial board members are by mutual agreement of the IMGC Secretariat, Springer and the remaining editors.

Annual meeting
The IMGS holds an annual meeting, the International Mouse Genome Conference (IMGC), that is attended by scientists from around the world. Prior to the formation of the society the mouse genetics community held a number of annual workshops, which the society adopted at the 4th workshop in Lunteren, Netherlands. The location for the meeting has rotated between Europe, the USA, and Japan. Recent IMGCs have hosted satellite events, including student symposia, bioinformatic workshops and mentoring breakfasts. In addition to the scientific program, the IMGC hosts the annual business meeting of the society, the annual secretariat meeting and often includes cultural or social events characteristic of host city or country.

In 1997, at the 11th Annual meeting, the IMGS inaugurated its first Verne Chapman Memorial Lecture. The annual seminar was named in honor of Verne M. Chapman, a former Director of Scientific Affairs at Roswell Park Comprehensive Cancer Center and a founding member of the society. A number of awards are also presented at each meeting, including the Verne Chapman Young Scientist Award.

From 1999 meeting, the conference program and abstracts are published online.

See also
List of genetics research organizations
Human Genome Organisation
Genetics Society of America

References

External links
 International Mammalian Genome Society website.
 International Mouse Genome Conference 2012 website.

Biology societies
Genomics organizations
Mammalogy
Organizations established in 1991
Organizations based in North Carolina